Roostijati (December 27, 1925 – September 5, 1975) was an Indonesian actress, soldier, radio announcer, and director. She became the second Indonesian women director after Ratna Asmara by directed Genangan Air Mata (1955), and was one of the six Indonesian women director before 1998. She was the part of Classical Indonesian Cinema.

Born and raised in Bandung, Roostijati went to Hollandsch-Inlandsche School, and completed her education at Mode Vaak School.

Early life 

Roostijati was born on December 27, 1925, in Bandung, West Java. Her brother was actor Djoni Sundawa.

Roostijati went to Hollandsch-Inlandsche School, and completed her education at Mode Vaak School. During her school year, she was known for her sporting abilities and was referred as the star of show.

Military career 
From 1945 until 1947, Roostijati was a captain of Laskar Wanita Indonesia (LASWI) in North Bandung, under the lead of Yati Arudji. She then joined sector III, and started working as a radio announcer, where she stole power tools for soldier in forest.

Entertainment career 

After the Indonesian National Revolution, Roostijati started her career as a regular radio announcer. She later became assistant treasurer of Persib Bandung, and won a ticket to visiting Produksi Film Negara (PFN) when Persib Bandung became a first runner up at the first National Sports Week.

When visiting PFN, she was discovered by Dr. Huyung, who later gave her a leading role in Kenangan Masa (1951). After that, she was cast in several films, mostly action films such as: Gadis Olahraga (1952), Tenang Menanti (1952), Kumala Dewa Dewi (1952), Dewa Dewi (1952), Nachoda Harimau Lapar (1953), and Rosita (1953).

In 1954, Roostijati starred as a leading role in Adios, a first cowboy themed film in Indonesia. She starred in two more films that year, such as: Konde Tjioda (1954), and Dewi Rimba (1954).

Screen persona and reception 

Roostijati's screen persona focused on her ability to doing sports and fencing, she was nicknamed the first action film actress of Indonesia.

In her film, Roostijati often played the role of a tomboy woman who love to jumps, swings, riding horses, and sometimes showing her fencing skills.

Filmography

Death 
Roostijati died in Bandung, West Java, on September 5, 1975, at the age of 49.

Legacy 
Only six female directors appeared in Indonesian cinema until 1998; aside from Roostijati, these women directors were Ratna Asmara, Sofia W.D., Chitra Dewi, Rima Melati, and Ida Farida. Of these, all except Farida had previous experience as actresses. These directors rarely, if ever, received the same recognition as their male counterparts, and acting remained the only way for a woman in the industry to gain recognition.

References

Works cited

External links 

1925 births
1975 deaths